Orta-Stal is a rural locality (a selo) Suleyman-Stalsky District, Republic of Dagestan, Russia. The population was 2,843 as of 2010. There are 55 streets.

Geography 
Orta-Stal is located 4 km north of Kasumkent (the district's administrative centre) by road. Yukhari-Stal is the nearest rural locality.

References 

Rural localities in Suleyman-Stalsky District